Combat Missions was a one-hour-long reality TV show produced by Mark Burnett and hosted by former Survivor castaway Rudy Boesch that aired from January to April in 2002 on the USA Network.  It pits four teams of highly experienced military and police operatives against each other in physical challenges and "mission" scenarios.  Each team has a call sign and corresponding color.  The four teams are Alpha (Red), Bravo (Blue), Charlie (Yellow) and Delta (Green). The team members were past and present members of SWAT, the United States Army Special Forces, the Navy SEALs, Marine Recon, the CIA Special Operations Group, Delta Force, and the U.S. Army Rangers. The mission scenarios has each team face off against the opposing "Shadow force" (not another team) using MILES gear in real-life combat situations. The show was not picked up for a second season.

Scott Helvenston, one of the contestants from the Delta team went on to work for Blackwater USA in Iraq after the show and was killed in action on March 31, 2004.

Competition 

The four squads in the competition are all unique.

Alpha Squad:  The young guns mainly with SEAL backgrounds.

Bravo Squad:  Urban assault consisting mainly of SWAT cops.

Charlie Squad:  The "Over the Hill" club.  Majority of the teammates are in their 40s and one in their 50s.

Delta Squad:  The oddballs including prankster Rod Nutter and Baz who works for the CIA.

Each of the four squads starts the competition with six players. The 15-week contest—each week referred to as an "Evolution"—is split into three rounds. During each evolution two squads are chosen to go head to head, first in a training exercise and then in a combat mission.

At the start of each evolution, all four squads are required to fall in formation when ordered and to report that each squad member is present.  Rudy Boesch will then tell them which two squads are going head to head during that evolution and may even add some additional information such as the weather condition for the day or a brief introduction of any new team members that have joined the squad.

Training exercises are usually physical challenges, including climbing, swimming, running and shooting. The winning squad receives extra points towards that week's mission.

The combat mission pits those two same squads into separate but identical situations against "Shadow Squad", who are also highly trained, in a combat-like scenario, some military in nature, some SWAT-related. Both squads start out with 1000 points, plus whatever point bonus was earned by the winner of the training mission. Points are then deducted for team members killed during the mission (50 points for each team member) and time taken in the mission itself (5 points per minute). Failure to complete all mandatory objectives, or the death of all team members results in a "total mission failure." There may be additional objectives given during the mission and will result in further point deductions if not completed (e.g. Evolutions 7 and 8 required the squads to secure an undercover ATF agent.  Failure to secure him resulted in a 100-point penalty).

After both squads have a run at the mission, they will be summoned to the briefing room where their results will be scored.  Whichever squad has the most points wins and their squad stays intact.  The losing squad will have 10 minutes to pack their gear and report to the discharge room.

For the first twelve evolutions, the team with the lower score was obligated to discharge a teammate. The choice for discharge would be selected either by vote or, in case of a tie or refusal, drawing swords until one man pulls one with a red tip; that man would be discharged. For the first six evolutions, the teammate who is being discharged will stay in the discharge room while the rest of the team headed into the dossier room to select a replacement.  The squad has 10 minutes to decide on whom to select.  From evolution 7-10, lost players were no longer replaced, severely weakening the losing squads.  If a team member from any squad during Evolutions 7-10 has an injury or illness that prevents him from continuing in the competition, they may voluntarily be discharged and the squad can go into the dossier room to find a replacement. During the last phase, the entire losing squad was kicked off in order to determine the overall winning squad. After that squad (Bravo) was selected, it was split into two teams of 3 who faced off. From those 3 remaining players one was eliminated in a Training Exercise, and the final two faced off in a mission in order to select the Combat Missions individual champion.

During the discharge ceremony at the end of each evolution, the three squads (2 squads that didn't compete during that evolution and the winning squad) fell in formation (similar to the beginning of each evolution).  The remaining squad members of the losing squad assemble up front waiting for their discharged teammate to exit the discharge room.  Once the discharged teammate comes out of the room, Rudy Boesch commends him and renders him a salute and officially dismisses him from the camp.  His teammates also say goodbye to him as he walks out.  A vehicle will pull up outside the camp gates to collect him.  During evolutions 1-6, the same vehicle will drop off a teammate whom the losing squad chose in the dossier room.  Evolutions 7-10 will have the vehicle collect the discharged teammate only. Evolutions 11-13 will have 2 vehicles pull up to collect the discharged squad and evolutions 14 and 15 will have a vehicle that will collect the losing teammates from the championship squad until 2 are left.

When the new teammate enters the camp, he will immediately go to Rudy to report for duty.  Rudy welcomes him and tells him which squad he is assigned to.  Then the order to fall out is given which concludes the discharge ceremony and this officially ends each evolution.

Contestants 

The following is a list of contestants from the "Dossier Room" who never got picked to play:

Results

Tank takeout (Evolution 1 and 2)

Start of Round 1: Lose the mission, lose a man and proceed to the dossier room to replace him.

Prior to the competition, all squads underwent physical training.  Started off with a 3-mile run, followed by a 2-lap rucksack run (50 pounds) around the base, and then as many pullups they can do.

Evolution 1 Training Exercise: Log Carry From Hell (25 Bonus Points toward Mission)

Bravo vs. Charlie

Both teams must carry a 500-pound log around an obstacle course.  Every 15 minutes, each team must drop a man.  The first team to drop the log loses.

Winner: Bravo

Evolution 2 Training Exercise: Helocasting (50 Bonus Points toward Mission)

Alpha vs Delta

Winner: Alpha

Mission: Tank Takeout

Objective is to destroy the tank with an explosive device.  Both teams will be inserted via helicopter and make their way on foot to the tank and then plant the explosive device to destroy the tank.  Surviving members will then make their way to the extraction point for helicopter extract.

Bravo vs Charlie:

Charlie got ambushed early but were able to fend off the initial assault with no casualties.  As they got near the tank Young was killed when two shadow squad members emerged from a bunker.  Krenshaw and Greaves were killed as they approached the tank but Everadge was able to take out the two members inside the tank.  Everadge was then killed as he tried to approach the tank.  Potter was then killed as he planted the explosive charges leaving Bugarin the lone survivor.

Early into the mission, Bravo lost one SEAL and one Marine but the remaining four SWAT cops on the team were able to complete the mission (notably Jody Taylor with 7 kills) despite the mission being SEAL in nature.

Winner: Bravo

In the Dossier room, Charlie struggled to select a teammate to discharge prompting Rudy Boesch to issue them an ultimatum:  Five minutes to choose a member to discharge or draw swords.  Charlie eventually decided to draw swords resulting in Jeff Everage's discharge (ironically Everage was against drawing swords).

Alpha vs Delta:

Rod Teeple (Team leader for Delta) advanced to the tank without the explosive charge and ignored pleas from his teammates to fall back as they have not yet cleared the tank.  This led to 2 unnecessary deaths (Teeple and Winn).

Chris Pate from Alpha squad struggled on the hill climb resulting in unnecessary time wasted which was a factor in his discharge.  Alpha destroyed the tank with all their men alive, but Shadow Squad prepared an ambush for them as they were moving to the extraction point resulting in 5 of the 6 team members killed.  (Scott Oates was the lone survivor)

Winner: Delta

Mission Results

Prisoner rescue (Evolution 3 and 4)

Evolution 3 Training Exercise: Weapons Assembly (25 Bonus Points toward Mission)

Bravo vs Delta

Each team must assemble and fire 6 weapons.  First team to successfully assemble and fire all 6 weapons wins.

Winner: Delta

Evolution 3 Training Exercise: The Gauntlet (50 Bonus Points toward Mission)

Bravo vs Delta

The team that clears the gauntlet (4 players from opposing team), by knocking them into the water, with the fewest men wins.

Winner: Delta

Evolution 4 Training Exercise: The Grid (75 Bonus Points toward Mission)

Alpha vs Charlie

Both teams start on opposite corners of a grid which floats on water and be the first team to knock all opposing team members into the water

Winner: Alpha

Mission: Prisoner Rescue

An American prisoner is being transported in a truck clearly marked with the number 13.  There is an armed checkpoint on the road the truck will travel through.  The objective is to ambush the truck and rescue the prisoner.   In each mission scenario, truck 13 overheated and was overtaken by truck 23.

Bravo vs Delta:

Jeff Byers from Bravo squad asked a good question during the briefing (is there similar trucks traveling that road?) which led them to be the only squad not to ambush the truck that reached the checkpoint first (marked with a 23), resulting in fewer enemies to deal with.  Not surprisingly all 6 of their team members survived.

Rod Teeple (Team Leader from Delta) took personal responsibility for their Total Mission Failure and discharged himself prior to voting.

Winner: Bravo

Charlie vs Alpha:

Ed Bugarin from Charlie squad had 7 kills and personally carried the team.

Winner: Alpha

Mission Results

Hostage rescue (Evolution 5 and 6)

Evolution 5 Training Exercise: Double Pit Cross (50 Bonus Points toward Mission)

Charlie vs Delta

During the water portion of the exercise, Ossie Crenshaw blacked out as his muscles seized up on him.  Ed Bugarin, Cade Courtley and Wilson Wong helped him out.

Winner: Delta

Evolution 6 Training Exercise: Obstacle Course (50 Bonus Points toward Mission)

Alpha vs Bravo

Jody Taylor injured his knee on the cargo net.

Winner: Alpha

Mission: Hostage Rescue

Mission objective is to rescue a hostage using Close Quarter Battle (CQB) techniques.  Local TV anchorwoman, Linda Morris, has been taken hostage by two individuals with AK-47s, she was shot in the leg.  Suspects are in an apartment building.  One member of the team will relieve the police officer on the scene and serve as an observation post. The clock will stop when the team successfully rescues the hostage and takes her to a waiting ambulance.

There will be a 50-point deduction if any innocents are shot and killed (They are wearing MILES gear).

During the mission, there was a 2nd hidden sniper lying in wait as the teams made their way out of the apartment building with their hostage.

Charlie vs Delta

Charlie suffered casualties as they were exiting the apartment building with their hostage.

Rodney Nutter of Delta squad had outstanding sharpshooting skills which came in handy as he was the situated at the observation post for the team.  As a result, none of his teammates were killed during the mission.

Winner: Delta

Alpha vs Bravo

This mission was suited for Bravo being SWAT in nature.  Jody Taylor was the lone casualty as the team exited the apartment building thanks to the hidden sniper.

Harald Zundel had good observation skills as the team exited the apartment building and was able to engage the hidden sniper allowing the team to escape unscathed.

Winner: Bravo

Mission Results

Alpha lost 250 points for cheating. They used a poncho to cover the hostage and defeat the purpose of the MILES laser gear which was against the rules. Then they lied when asked why they did it, offering the excuse that they were "treating for shock".  Daniel Patrick O'Shea (team leader for Alpha) later admitted that it was his decision to use the poncho. (Alpha would have defeated Bravo by 35 points if they didn't cheat)

Pilot down (Evolution 7 and 8)

Start of Round 2: Teams who discharge a man through losing a mission may not get a replacement unless it is a medical discharge.

During Evolution 7 Scott Helvenston played the role of a pest getting under the skin of some Alpha team members (notably Mel Spicer and Daniel O'Shea) during the Training Exercises.  It got so bad that all four teams had an informal meeting at the Snake Pit with Rudy Boesch and other senior ranking officials.  Members of Alpha confronted Helvenston whom they believe has gone too far in poor sportsmanship and creating a bad reputation among the SEALS.

Evolution 7 Training Exercise: Rifle Marksmanship (25 Bonus Points toward Mission)

Each team will have a target to shoot at with the objective of aiming at the bulls eye.  The highest number of bulls-eyes wins.

Alpha vs Delta

Winner: Delta

Evolution 7 Training Exercise: The Grid (50 Bonus Points toward Mission)

Alpha vs Delta

First and second matches were nullified due to excessive grabbing.

Winner: Delta

Evolution 8 Training Exercise: Helocasting (75 Bonus Points toward Mission)

Winner: Charlie

Mission: Pilot Down

Mission objective is to rescue a downed pilot before the enemy finds him.  The pilot has ejected and still alive.  The enemy (Shadow Squad) is looking for the pilot and they can be reinforced within 30 minutes by ground transportation.  All teams were instructed to move to the primary extract point after pilot is secured and call headquarters for extract.  If the primary extract point is compromised, they must move to an alternate extract point specified by headquarters.  In each mission scenario, the primary extract point was compromised as a Shadow Squad member would shoot down the helicopter scheduled to collect the team with their hostage.

Alpha vs Delta

Alpha got ambushed by Shadow Squad as they moved to their alternate extract point resulting in casualties.

Winner: Delta

Bravo vs Charlie

Winner: Bravo

Missile hangar (Evolution 9 and 10)

Evolution 9 Training Exercise: Rope Climb (25 Bonus Points toward Mission)

5 team members will climb a rope one at a time carrying a 40-pound pack, then come down the rope and enter a bunker and fire a weapon and return to their teammates.

Alpha vs Bravo

Winner: Alpha

Evolution 9 Training Exercise: Double Pit Cross (50 Bonus Points toward Mission)

Alpha vs Bravo

Winner: Alpha

Evolution 10 Training Exercise: Obstacle Course (50 Bonus Points toward Mission)

Charlie vs Delta

Winner: Delta

Evolution 10 Training Exercise: Transition Drill (25 Bonus Points toward Mission)

Four shooters are armed with an M4 with only one round, the last shooter has an M9 pistol with a full magazine.  The first team to drop all five targets in order from front to rear wins.

Charlie vs Delta

Winner: Charlie

Mission: Missile Hangar

The objective is to retrieve a missile guidance system that is held inside a hangar currently used by a terrorist group.  They will be inserted via helicopter on the roof of the hangar. They must first disable the enemies satellite communication dish and set an explosive device.  Once the charge is set they must radio headquarters telling them they have accomplished this objective.  They will then rappel into the hangar to retrieve the guidance system while repelling the enemy using Close Quarters Battle (CQB) techniques.  The helicopter will be waiting outside the south doors of the hangar.

During the mission, once they have confirmed disabling the satellite communication dish, headquarters will tell them that there is an undercover ATF agent, Todd Nelson, whom they need to secure.  They are given his description (Caucasian, 5'10, 175 lbs, receding hairline, has a mustache and wears glasses).  If they fail to secure him, they will lose 100 points.

Alpha vs Bravo

Bravo killed the undercover ATF agent off the bat and ended up securing the wrong man.  They asked the man if he was an undercover agent to which the man replied in the negative.  They took him anyway.

Harald Zundel cut his nose as he was rappelling into the hangar.

Winner: Bravo

Charlie vs Delta

Winner: Delta

Meth lab (Evolution 11 and 12)

Beginning of Round 3: Lose the mission, entire squad will be discharged.

Evolution 11 Training Exercise: Weapons Assembly (25 Bonus Points toward Mission)

Teams must assemble four weapons one man at a time.  First squad to assemble and fire all four weapons wins.

Bravo vs Charlie

Winner: Bravo

Evolution 11 Training Exercise: The Grid (50 Bonus Points toward Mission)

Bravo vs Charlie.

First round was a stalemate (Charlie had the upper hand but Steve Claggett from Bravo stubbornly refused to go into the water prompting the decision for a redo).

Winner: Bravo

Evolution 12 Training Exercise: The Gauntlet (50 Bonus Points toward Mission)

Winner: Alpha

Mission: Meth Lab

A drug cartel has set up a meth lab in the desert.  Their leader is Santos Hernandez.  This is a reconnaissance mission with teams being the eyes and the ears for headquarters.  The objective is to get enough information to get a warrant to arrest Santos Hernandez.  They will be given a camera for documentation.  Headquarters wants to know if it is a working lab, how many suspects, what type of vehicles, how many weapons and any other useful information.  Teams will radio headquarters with their findings and await further instructions.

During the mission, while the teams are sending information to headquarters, they will have to verify if Santos Hernandez is at the meth lab location.  Santos Hernandez in fact does make an appearance later on ordering the lab to pack up and leave.  When teams have positively identified Santos Hernandez, headquarters ordered the teams to arrest him for questioning.  The time will stop once they radio headquarters confirming the arrest.  He must be taken alive otherwise teams will be penalized 250 points.

Alpha and Charlie, already shorthanded with 4 team members each, were unable to secure Sanchez proving the point that losing teams will be weakened significantly.

Fuel dump demolition (Evolution 13)

Team Championship Round to determine overall squad winner.

Evolution 13 Training Exercise: Helocasting (50 Bonus Points toward Mission)

Bravo vs Delta

Winner: Bravo

Mission: Fuel Dump Demolition

The objective is to blow up the fuel dump.  Teams must reach their Objective Rallying Point (ORP) and call headquarters before blowing up the fuel dump.  Shadow squad can be reinforced in a few minutes by armored tank so teams have to move fast.  Teams will be equipped with an anti-tank gun.

During the mission, teams observed Prisoners of War (POW) being mistreated by Shadow Squad.  Headquarters then tell the teams that their primary mission is to rescue all the POWs while their secondary objective is to destroy the fuel dump.

For being the team Champion, each member of Bravo wins $25000.

Urban Assault (Evolution 14)

Bravo squad was split up into two teams (Bravo Red and Bravo Blue).  Each player drew a sword and the two players who drew the marked sword became the team captain and selected their team members (Bob Kain and Sean Sirker).

Training Exercise

The first training exercise was a combination of previous evolutions (Helocasting, log carry, 1 Lap rucksack run, pit-cross and swim across the lake with the rucksack).  First team to reach their bunker and sets off the explosive charge wins.  The losing team will have to carry an additional 10 pounds in their rucksacks for the final mission. (Rucksack original weight is 50 pounds).

Winner: Bravo Blue

Training Exercise: The Grid

The first team to knock all the opposing team members into the water (best 2 out of 3) wins.  The losing team will have to carry an additional 10 pounds in their rucksack for the final mission which means that the team that lost the previous training exercise (Bravo Red) would have to carry an additional 20 pounds for the final mission if they lose.

Round 1 Result: Bravo Red Win

Round 2 Result: Bravo Blue Win

Round 3 Result: Bravo Red Win

Winner: Bravo Red

Mission

For the mission, both squads begin at opposite ends of a neighborhood that contain one story houses.  They will be given a map to guide them to a house where they will find a supply of ammunition and another map to another house.

The goal is to move at least one of their men to 5 houses and the map in the 5th house will direct them to their final objective.  First team to pop smoke at the final location wins.  The losing team will be discharged.

There are no penalty points for time elapsed or team members killed although both teams will wear the MILES laser system and can be killed by the other team.

Best of the Best Combat Missions Championship (Evolution 15)

Bravo Blue was split into individuals and competed head to head separated by color.

Jeff Byers: Yellow

Bob Kain: Blue

Dexter Fletcher: Red

Training Exercise: Obstacle Course

The first training exercise is a race through an obstacle course with the winner wearing a 30-pound rucksack for the next mission, second place wears a 40-pound rucksack and third place wears a 50-pound rucksack.

1st Place: Jeff Byers

2nd Place: Dexter Fletcher

3rd Place: Bob Kain

Mission: Desert Assault

A 600-meter race with colored targets to shoot at along the way.  Each player must shoot all targets matching their color and get to the helicopter at the finish line.  Last person to finish will be discharged.

Jeff Byers had issues with his weapon as it was constantly jamming which ultimately led to his discharge.  Rudy consoled him at the discharge ceremony and wouldn't have minded seeing a fellow SEAL win the competition.

Final Mission: Last Man Standing

Players will wear a face shield with a target on it.  They will start at opposite sides of a maze filled with glass panels.  As time goes on, the glass panels will shatter leaving both players more vulnerable to getting hit. The first person to make a clean hit on the Target of their opponent's shield will be crowned Combat Missions Champion.

Contestants on Other Competition Shows
 John Winn previously competed on American Gladiators, where he was the winner of the Armed Forces Challenge of Champions special in season six.
 Cade Courtley would later appear on a 2017 episode of Shark Tank, where he pitched his product Victory Coffee.  He was rejected by all five panelists.
 Scott Helvenston appeared on the controversial competition show Man vs. Beast, where he defeated a chimpanzee in an obstacle course challenge.

References

External links
 
 

2002 American television series debuts
2002 American television series endings
2000s American reality television series
USA Network original programming